Damaliscus hypsodon is an extinct species of antelope from the Late Pleistocene of Africa. Fossils have been found in Kenya and Tanzania.

Taxonomy
It was first described in 2012, though its remains were initially discovered in 1990 and went unnamed. The earliest remains are from around 392 to 330 ka, while the latest are from as recently as 12,000 years ago.

Description
Damaliscus hypsodon was a small alcelaphine, only around the size of an impala. The teeth of D. hypsodon showed a degree of hypsodonty greater than living antelopes and comparable to horses, indicating that it was a specialized grazer. Its remains have been found in association with oryx and zebras, which along with its tooth morphology suggest that it lived in open and arid grasslands.

References

Prehistoric bovids
Pleistocene even-toed ungulates
Pleistocene mammals of Africa
Prehistoric mammals of Africa
Pleistocene extinctions
Prehistoric even-toed ungulates